Think It Over is the third studio album by American gospel/soul singer Cissy Houston, released in 1978 on Private Stock Records. The album was produced by Michael Zager and features Houston's R&B hit "Think It Over", which peaked at #5 on the Billboards Dance chart and #32 on Billboards Hot Soul chart.

In 2013, the original recording was remastered and re-released on CD with bonus tracks under Cherry Red Records. The bonus extra are remixes of "An Umbrella Song", "Warning-Danger", "Somebody Should Have Told Me" and "Think It Over", which were originally included on her 1979's album Warning-Danger, released by Columbia Records.

Track listing
Side One
"Think It Over" (Alvin Fields, Cissy Houston, Michael Zager) – 6:00
"Love Don't Hurt People" (Ron Netsky, Steve Netsky) – 3:01
"Somebody Should Have Told Me" (Cissy Houston, Doug Frank, Doug James) – 4:30
"After You" (Doug Frank, Doug James) – 4:38
Side Two
"Warning - Danger" (Alvin Fields, Cissy Houston, Michael Zager) – 5:56
"I Just Want To Be With You" (Alvin Fields, Michael Zager) – 5:08
"An Umbrella Song" (Alvin Fields, Michael Zager) – 2:58
"Sometimes" (Alvin Fields, Cissy Houston, Michael Zager) – 3:33
"I Won't Be The One" (Alvin Fields, Cissy Houston, Doug Frank) – 3:00

CD reissue bonus tracks
 "Warning-Danger" (Extended Disco Mix) – 10:26 
 "An Umbrella Song" (Extended Disco Mix) – 5:52 	
 "Somebody Should Have Told Me" (Extended Disco Mix) – 8:04		
 "Think It Over" (Extended Disco Mix) – 7:59

Production
Arranged By [Backing Vocals] – Cissy Houston, Michael Zager (tracks: A1 to B1, B3 to B5)
Arranged By, Conductor – Michael Zager
Backing Vocals – Alvin Fields (tracks: A1 to B2, B4, B5), Beverly Ingram (tracks: A3, A4, B2, B4, B5), Cissy Houston (tracks: A1 to B2, B4, B5)Donny Harper (tracks: B2, B5), Lani Groves (tracks: A1, A2, B1), Whitney Houston (tracks: A1 to B2, B4, B5)
Baritone Saxophone – Ronnie Cuber
Bass – Francisco Centeno
Alto Saxophone – Lenny Hambro
Drums – Allan Schwartzberg
Electric Piano – Michael Zager (tracks: B2)
Engineer [Assistant] – Darroll Gustamachio
Engineer [Recording, Mixing] – Rick Rowe
Executive-Producer – Jerry Love
Guitar – Jeff Mironov
Harmonica – Michael Chimes (tracks: B3)
Keyboards, Synthesizer, Synthesizer [Moog] – Rob Mounsey
Mastered By – Joey Gastwirt
Percussion – Rubens Bassini
Strings – Alfred Brown String Section
Trombone – Gerald Chamberlain
Bass Trombone – Jack Jeffers
Trumpet, Flugelhorn – Alan Rubin, Burt Collins, John Gatchell, Robert Milliken
Vibraphone – Dave Carey
Art Direction – Abie Sussman
Voice [Siren] – Jerry Love (tracks: B1)

Credits
Produced, Arranged, Conducted – Michael Zager
Executive-producer – Jerry Love
Recorded at Secret Sound Studios, New York City. 
Mastered at Masterdisc, New York City.

Charts
Singles

References

External links
Cissy Houston Bio page
Cissy Houston - Think It Over CD

1978 albums
Cissy Houston albums
Private Stock Records albums